The Setzer's mouse-tailed dormouse (Myomimus setzeri) is a species of rodent in the family Gliridae. It is endemic to Iran. Very little information is available for this genus Myomimus member, with just only 10 specimens known. It is found mainly in the pellets of the Eurasian eagle owl.

References

External links
 EDGE of Existence page on Setzer's Mouse-tailed Dormouse

Myomimus
Dormouse, Setzer's mouse-tailed
EDGE species
Mammals described in 1976
Taxonomy articles created by Polbot